Shake is the ninth studio album by the Italian blues rock singer-songwriter Zucchero Fornaciari, released on 14 September 2001. The album was mostly recorded in 2001 at The Plan Studios in Hollywood with producer Corrado Rustici, and previewed near Rovigo, on 9 September 2001.

Overview
In this album, the last one produced by the historical producer Corrado Rustici, Zucchero used the technique of sampling. Starting from an old collection of vinyls owned by his American programmer, the Italian bluesman tried to recreate a vintage and blues sound by taking some portions of sound recordings and reusing them as new instruments. He borrowed the idea from other important albums, such as Play (1999) by Moby or works by Fatboy Slim.

Composition
The album opens with three blues rock songs. Sento le campane whose music is by Zucchero, Isaac Hayes and David Porter, Music In Me and Porca l'oca. The latter samples What'd I Say by Ray Charles, who also recordered the song together with Zucchero. The fourth song, Ali d'oro, represents the last recording of John Lee Hooker's career. The American bluesman sings the chorus "I lay down with an angel". The music, typical of a blues ballad, is composed by Zucchero and Luciano Luisi. Ahum is co-written with the friend and old colleague Roberto Zanetti, as well as Music In Me and Baila (Sexy Things), and samples Barry White's version of Just the Way You Are. In Scintille samples from Deceiving Blues by Teddy Darby and from Feelin' Lowdown by Big Bill Broonzy were taken. Baila (Sexy Things), released as the first single in Italy, is the true core of the selling success of the entire album, peaking at #1 in Italy, France and Spain. For the composition, Zucchero sampled Take Me to the River by Al Green and Mannish Boy by Muddy Waters. The next two ballads Dindondio, whose theme is the countryside life, and Rossa mela della sera sample the choir Oh! Death Where Is Thy Sting? and Choladas by M. Vivanco, respectively. After the rock title track, the last song Tobia, whose lyrics are by the songwriter Francesco De Gregori, is dedicated to the lost Zucchero's dog. The album topped the chart of Italy (for four weeks) and Switzerland (for three weeks) and arrived in the charts of Netherlands, France, Belgium, Spain, Germany, Mexico, Argentina and Austria.

Track listing

Charts

Weekly charts

Year-end charts

Certifications

References

Zucchero Fornaciari albums
2001 albums